These are the Billboard Hot Dance Club Play and Singles Sales number-one hits of 2004.

See also
List of number-one dance airplay hits of 2004 (U.S.)
2004 in music
List of Billboard number-one dance club songs
List of artists who reached number one on the U.S. Dance Club Songs chart

References

2004
United States Dance Club Play
2004 in American music